The Beguiled is a 1971 American Southern Gothic film directed by Don Siegel, starring Clint Eastwood, Geraldine Page and Elizabeth Hartman. The script was written by Albert Maltz and is based on the 1966 novel written by Thomas P. Cullinan, originally titled A Painted Devil. The film marks the third of five collaborations between Siegel and Eastwood, following Coogan's Bluff (1968) and Two Mules for Sister Sara (1970), and continuing with Dirty Harry (1971) and Escape from Alcatraz (1979).

Plot
During the American Civil War in 1863, Amy, a 12-year-old student at the Miss Martha Farnsworth Seminary for Young Ladies in rural Mississippi, discovers a seriously wounded Union soldier, John McBurney. She brings him to the school's gated enclosure where the school headmistress, Martha Farnsworth, first insists on turning him over to Confederate troops, but then decides to restore him to health first. He is initially kept locked in the school's music room and kept under watch. Edwina, the schoolteacher who has had no experience with men, takes an immediate liking to John, as does Carol, a 17-year-old student who makes advances with an experienced air.

John begins to bond with each of the women in the house, including the slave Hallie. As he charms each of them, the sexually repressed atmosphere of the school becomes filled with jealousy and deceit, and the women begin to turn on one another. After Carol, who earlier made a welcomed pass at John, witnesses John kissing Edwina in the garden, she ties a blue rag to the school's entrance gate to alert the Confederate troops to the presence of a Yankee soldier. When a band of Confederate soldiers see it while passing the school, Martha lies and helps John pretend he is a relative loyal to the Confederacy.

Martha also becomes infatuated with John, and a flashback shows her having an incestuous relationship with her brother. Martha considers keeping John at the school as a handyman. She makes sexual advances toward him, which he resists.

Late one night, Edwina discovers John having sex with Carol in her bedroom. In a jealous rage, she beats him with a candlestick, causing him to fall down the staircase and break his leg severely. Martha insists he will die of gangrene unless they amputate his leg. The women carry him to the kitchen where they tie him to the table. Martha saws off his leg at the knee. When John awakens and learns that his leg has been amputated, he goes into a fury, convinced that Martha performed the operation as revenge for his rejection of her sexual advances.

John, under lock and key, convinces Carol to unlock his door.  He sneaks from his room into Martha's room and steals a pistol and some personal items of Martha's including some letters from her brother. Convinced that Martha plans to hold him prisoner, John confronts Martha at gunpoint, claiming control of the house and declaring his intention to have his way with any of the women or girls. He gets drunk and then confronts the entire household, revealing that he read Martha's letters and that they implicate Martha and her brother in an incestuous relationship. In a fit of anger he also kills Amy's pet turtle. Edwina follows John to his room and professes her love for him. They begin to kiss and it is later implied that they had sex.

Meanwhile, Martha convinces the others (except for Edwina, who is not present) that they need to kill John to prevent him from denouncing them to Union troops who have made camp within sight of the school. Martha asks Amy to pick mushrooms they can prepare "especially for him" and Amy says she knows just where to find some. At dinner, John apologizes for his actions, and Edwina reveals that she and John have made plans to leave the school and marry. John has been eating the mushrooms and the others pass the bowl without taking any except for Edwina. When she starts to eat some, Martha cries out for her to stop. John realizes he has been poisoned, and leaves the dining room disoriented, and collapses in the hallway. The following day, the women sew his corpse into a burial shroud and carry him out of the gate to bury. They agree he died of exhaustion, and Amy denies she could ever pick a poisonous mushroom by mistake.

Cast
 Clint Eastwood as Corporal John 'McBee' McBurney
 Geraldine Page as Martha Farnsworth
 Elizabeth Hartman as Edwina Dabney
 Jo Ann Harris as Carol
 Darleen Carr as Doris
 Mae Mercer as Hallie
 Pamelyn Ferdin as Amelia 'Amy'
 Melody Thomas as Abigail
 Peggy Drier as Lizzie
 Pattye Mattick as Janie

Production
Clint Eastwood was given a copy of the 1966 novel by producer Jennings Lang, and was engrossed throughout the night in reading it. This was the first of several films where Eastwood agreed to storylines where nubile females look at him adoringly (including minors in this film and Pale Rider). Eastwood considered the film as "an opportunity to play true emotions and not totally operatic and not lighting cannons with cigars". Albert Maltz was brought in to draft the script, but disagreements in the end led to a revision of the script by Claude Traverse, who although uncredited, led to Maltz being credited under a pseudonym. Maltz had originally written a script with a happy ending, in which Eastwood's character and the girl live happily ever after. Both Eastwood and director Don Siegel felt that an ending faithful to that of the book would be a stronger anti-war statement, and Eastwood's character would be killed. The film, according to Siegel, deals with the themes of sex, violence and vengeance, and was based around "the basic desire of women to castrate men" though the central theme was the impact of a man having sex with multiple women.

Jeanne Moreau was considered for the role of the domineering Martha Farnsworth, but the role went to Geraldine Page, and actresses Elizabeth Hartman, Jo Ann Harris, Darlene Carr, Mae Mercer, and Pamelyn Ferdin were cast in supporting roles.

Universal initially wanted Siegel to film at a studio at Disney Studios Ranch, but Siegel preferred to have it filmed at an antebellum estate near Baton Rouge, Louisiana in Ascension Parish: the Ashland-Belle Helene Plantation, a historic house built in 1841, that was a plantation estate and home of Duncan Farrar Kenner. Portions of the interiors were filmed at Universal Studios. Filming started in April 1970 and lasted 10 weeks.

Eastwood had signed a long-term contract with Universal but became angry with the studio because he felt that they botched its release. This eventually led to his leaving the studio in 1975 after the release of The Eiger Sanction, which he directed as well as starred in. He would not work with Universal again until 2008's Changeling.

Eastwood said of his role in The Beguiled,

Reception
The Beguiled holds a 90% approval rating on review aggregator website Rotten Tomatoes, based on 20 reviews, with a weighted average of 7.3/10.

Vincent Canby of The New York Times wrote that the film "is not, indeed, successful as baroque melodrama, and, towards the end, there are so many twists and turns of plot and character that everything that's gone before is neutralized. People who consider themselves discriminating moviegoers, but who are uncommitted to Mr. Siegel will be hard put to accept it, other than as a sensational, misogynistic nightmare." A negative review in Variety said that the film "doesn't come off, and the apparent attempt to mesh Charles Addams style with Tennessee Williams-type material cues audience laughter in all the wrong places." Gene Siskel of the Chicago Tribune gave the film two stars out of four and wrote that Siegel "unfortunately elects to tell his story with a broad and leering humor that at times is barely distinguishable from a sexploitation shocker." Kevin Thomas of the Los Angeles Times praised The Beguiled as "a film of psychological suspense laced with dark humor that is a triumph of style, totally engrossing and utterly convincing." Gary Arnold of The Washington Post slammed the film as "anything but beguiling. Weird, yes; trashy, yes; pathetic, yes; beguiling, no." Nigel Andrews of The Monthly Film Bulletin called it "a film that works best when it is most outrageous. Geraldine Page's piously neurotic Miss Martha and Elizabeth Hartman's sickly Edwina hover on the brink of self-parody for most of the film, and are pushed well over in Siegel's climactic dream sequence, which begins with multiple-exposure effects and triangular embraces and ends with a shot of the two women supporting a limply naked Eastwood in the pose of Van Der Weyden's 'Pieta' (which hangs ambiguously on Page's bedroom wall)."

The film received major recognition in France, and was proposed by Pierre Rissient to the Cannes Film Festival, and while agreed to by Eastwood and Siegel, the producers declined. It would be widely screened in France later and is considered one of Eastwood's finest works by the French. The film was poorly marketed and in the end grossed little over $1 million, earning less than a fourth of what Sweet Sweetback's Baadasssss Song did at the same time and falling to below 50 in the charts within two weeks of release.

Made right before Dirty Harry, this was a bold early attempt by Eastwood to play against type. It was not a hit, likely due to uncertainty on Universal's part concerning how to market it, eventually leading them to advertise the film as a hothouse melodrama: "One man...seven women...in a strange house!" "His love... or his life..." According to Eastwood and Jennings Lang, the film, aside from being poorly publicized, flopped due to Eastwood's being "emasculated in the film". The film's poster, for example, shows him with a gun, suggesting an action movie, but the only action consists of a few seconds of flashback to Eastwood's character in battle before being wounded.

Quentin Tarantino later wrote the movie "was the closest Siegel ever came to making an art film... and truth be told, as good as it is, as its director, he's miscast. While the offbeat film is ultimately successful, it does bring out Siegel's worst stylistic impulses. His fondness for Freudian imagery, his literalness in a tale that screams for ambiguity (a dream sequence in the middle makes explicit everything that had only been suggested). However, once Siegel settles down and focuses on Eastwood, the film comes alive."

Other film adaptations

Sofia Coppola wrote and directed a film based on the same source material with Nicole Kidman, Colin Farrell, Kirsten Dunst and Elle Fanning. It had its world premiere at the Cannes Film Festival in May 2017. The film was released by Focus Features on June 23, 2017.

See also
 List of American films of 1971

References

Bibliography
 Hirsch, Foster (1971–72). "The Beguilded: Southern Gothic revived." Film Heritage, 7, 15–20.
 Kay, Karyn. (1976) "The Beguiled: Gothic Misogyny." Velvet Light Trap, 16, 32–33.

External links
 
 
 
 The Beguiled at Rotten Tomatoes

1971 films
1970s erotic thriller films
1970s erotic drama films
1970s historical drama films
American historical drama films
American Civil War films
American erotic thriller films
Films about amputees
Films based on American novels
Films directed by Don Siegel
Incest in film
Poisoning in film
Films scored by Lalo Schifrin
Southern Gothic films
1971 drama films
Films set in Mississippi
1970s English-language films
1970s American films
Films about disability